HMS Forward was a shore establishment of the British Royal Navy during World War II. It was based at South Heighton, just outside Newhaven, East Sussex.

Service history
Based in a former Guinness Trust Holiday Home, Forward served as the command centre for all Royal Naval establishments in the area and was responsible for:
 , the Electrical Training School at Eastbourne.
 HMS Forward II (renamed  in 1942), the Coastal Forces base at Newhaven.
 HMS Vernon (R), the Torpedo, Mining & Electrical Training Establishment at Roedean School, Brighton.

In 1941 a complex of tunnels were constructed  underground to house a centre which plotted all shipping traffic in the English Channel between Dungeness and Selsey Bill, in conjunction with the coastal radar chain.

Forward was decommissioned on 31 August 1945.

References

Royal Navy shore establishments
Royal Navy bases in England
Military history of East Sussex
Newhaven, East Sussex